Giulio Bisegni (born 4 April 1992) is an Italian rugby union player who plays as a Centre . He currently plays for Colorno in Top10.  

Born in Frascati he was coached at local mini team ASD Frascati Mini Rugby 2001, in 2010 season he moved to promoted side Lazio, a team based in Rome. In January 2014, he trained with Zebre as a permit player. In May 2014, it was announced that he joined Zebre and he played for Italian team until 2021–22 United Rugby Championship season.

In 2012 Bisegni was named in the Italy U20 squad and in 2014 and 2015 he was part of Emerging Italy squad.

On 18 August 2019, he was named in the final 31-man squad for the 2019 Rugby World Cup and he represented Italy on 16 occasions, from 2015 to 2020.

external list
It's Rugby Profile
ESPN Profile

References

1992 births
Italian rugby union players
Living people
People from Frascati
Zebre Parma players
Italy international rugby union players
Rugby union centres
S.S. Lazio Rugby 1927 players
Sportspeople from the Metropolitan City of Rome Capital